The 2000 FINA Diving World Cup was held in Sydney, Australia.

Medal winners

Men

Women

References
 "FINA Diving World Cup Medalist"

External links
 www.fina.org/

FINA Diving World Cup
Fina Diving World Cup
Fina Diving World Cup
Diving competitions in Australia
Sports competitions in Sydney
International aquatics competitions hosted by Australia